Stefano Tarallo (born 8 March 1976) is a former professional tennis player from Italy.

Biography
A right-handed player from Rome, Tarallo turned professional in 1996.

He reached his career best singles ranking of 147 in 2000, a year in which he won three titles on the Challenger circuit. 

At the Palermo ATP Tour tournament in 2000 he received a wildcard into the main draw and made the round of 16, with a first-round win over Federico Luzzi, who he partnered with in the doubles.

In 2001 he featured in the qualifying draws for the Australian Open and French Open.

Challenger titles

Singles: (3)

References

External links
 
 

1976 births
Living people
Italian male tennis players
Tennis players from Rome